The Indian Emperour, or the Conquest of Mexico by the Spaniards, being the Sequel of The Indian Queen is an English Restoration era stage play, a heroic drama written by John Dryden that was first performed in the Spring of 1665. The play has been considered a defining work in the subgenre of heroic drama, in which "rhymed heroic tragedy comes into full being." As its subtitle indicates, the play deals with the Spanish conquest of the Aztec Empire under Hernán Cortés.

Performance
The premiere production was staged by the King's Company at the Theatre Royal, Drury Lane; it featured Michael Mohun as the Emperor, Charles Hart as Cortez, Edward Kynaston as Guyomar, Nicholas Burt as Vasquez, William Wintershall as Odmar, William Cartwright as the Priest, and Anne Marshall as Almeria. The original production employed a "gorgeously feathered cloak" that Aphra Behn had brought back from Surinam, along with "glorious wreaths for...heads, necks, arms, legs." Dryden spiced his play with crowd-pleasing features, including incantations and conjured spirits, and an elaborate grotto scene with "a Fountain spouting."

On opening night, Dryden had a program distributed to the audience, on the connection between this play and his earlier The Indian Queen (a collaboration with his brother-in-law Sir Robert Howard). When the Duke of Buckingham and his collaborators satirised Dryden in The Rehearsal (1671), they had their Dryden-substitute Bayes say "that he had printed many reams to instill into the audience some conception of his plot."

The play was a major popular success, and was revived in 1667, with Nell Gwyn as Cydaria and Mary Knep in the role of Alibech. Samuel Pepys saw a performance; though he was an admirer of Gwyn, he condemned her performance in the role of the Emperour's daughter, calling it "a great and serious part, which she do most basely."

The play was also given an amateur performance at Court in 1668, which included James Scott, 1st Duke of Monmouth and his Duchess in the cast. Pepys criticised the elite cast as mostly "fools and stocks"—though he did not actually see the production in question.

Publication
The play was first published in 1667 by Henry Herringman. Dryden dedicated the play to Ann Scott, Duchess of Monmouth and Buccleuch, whom he called his "first and best patroness." Subsequent editions followed in 1668, 1670, 1681, 1686, 1692, 1694, and 1696, all from Herringman; the 1692 edition coincided with another stage revival.

Sources
Dryden's sources for his play, both historical and literary, have been disputed and debated. Two sources of major significance were Sir William Davenant's The Cruelty of the Spaniards in Peru (1658), and the Spanish accounts of the conquest in Purchas his Pilgrimes (1625 edition). Dryden also took plot elements from a play by Pedro Calderón de la Barca, El príncipe constante (c. 1628–29), which Dryden read in the original Spanish. One aspect of Dryden's plot, Guyomar and Odmar's competition for Alibech, comes from Georges de Scudéry's poem Alaric (1654).

In turn, Voltaire borrowed from Dryden's play for his drama Alzire.

Plot
In his play, Dryden presents the type of conflict between love and honour that is typical of his serious drama. Montezuma refuses a chance to save his kingdom from conquest, for personal reasons:But of my crown thou too much care dost take;
That which I value more, my love's at stake.

Cortez takes the opposite course, turning his back on his love for Cydaria to obey the orders of his king, even though he acknowledges that those orders are flawed. Montezuma gets the worst of their conflict; tortured by the Spaniards, he ends the play  with his suicide.

Dryden wanted to portray Cortez as high-minded and magnanimous; but he also wanted to show the Spaniards as cruel and oppressive. He managed this by the wildly ahistorical recourse of bringing Francisco Pizarro into the play as a subordinate of Cortez, and making Pizarro the villain.

Modern critics have studied the play from feminist and anti-colonialist viewpoints.

Dramatis personae and relationship status

MONTEZUMA, Emperor of Mexico and consort of Almeria
ODMAR, Montezuma’s eldest son in contention for the love of Alibech
GUYOMAR, Montezuma’s younger son in contention for the love of Alibech
ORBELLAN, son of the late Indian Queen by Traxalla, betrothed to Cydaria
TRAXALLA, High Priest of the Sun.
CYDARIA, Montezuma’s daughter, Courted by Cortez, betrothed to Orbellan
ALMERIA, sister to Alibech, daughter of the late Indian Queen, consort of Montezuma
ALIBECH, sister to Almeria, daughter of the late Indian Queen,
CORTEZ, the Spanish General, In love with Cydaria
VASQUEZ, Commander under Cortez, unknowingly in love with Alibech
PIZARRO, Commander under Cortez, In love with gold

Act 1, Scene 1. A pleasant Indian country

The arrival of the Spaniards reveals their intentions with the new land. They discuss the dwindling resources of Spain and the richness of the land they intend to conquer
and exploit. The Taxallan Indians, a rival of the Aztecs under Spanish command, have
informed the officers of Montezuma's presence. Cortez commands his guide to bring
him to Mexico to first offer peace and, that notwithstanding, to make war.

Act 1, Scene 2. A Temple

Starting with the High Priest finishing a blood ritual honouring Montezuma's birthday,
the royal party arrives to the Temple. The High Priest asks Montezuma, in accordance
with the ritual, to pick out his future queen. Montezuma surrenders his love to Almeria,
who as the daughter of his late rival scorns Mont.’s love but seeks to control him and
his power through the relationship. Odmar tries to sway Mont. from his choice but is
unsuccessful as Almeria pledges her love to Mont. who is enamored with her. Guyomar
enters and describes the Spaniards arrival in terms he understands interpreted by the HP
as in accordance with a prophecy about “floating castles”. Mont. sends the HP to see
what their arrival portends as he finishes up the ritual by having his sons pick brides.
They both pledge their love to Alibech who in turn refuses both. The two sons argue
over her before Mont. silences them and asks Orbellan to also pick a bride. He chooses
Cydaria, who despite her hatred for Orbellan recognises her duty to her father to marry
him and join the Indian nations. Her acceptance is interrupted by the arrival of the
Spanish officers. Mont. thinks them gods at first but soon realises they are emissaries
of “some petty prince” King Charles V. The Commanders issue the terms of Mont's
surrender (gold, submission, and conversion) while Cydaria catches Cortez's eye. Mont

refuses the Terms of Peace and leaves with the royal party but not before Cortez ask that
Cydaria be able to stay a moment that they may talk. Cortez falls for her and she begins
to fall for him when Orbellan reenters and fetches Cydaria back to Mexico, which now
prepares for war.

Act 2, Scene 1. The Magician's Cave

Montezuma and the high priest call upon spirits to guide them in their choices. The
spirits inform him of the destiny of his people and their ruin, him to give up his scepter
but he refuses their prophecy (“Doom as thy please my Empire not to stand, I’ll grasp my
scepter with my dying hand”) He insists a better prophecy must exist and asks the high priest to summon again.  A spirit dressed in all white appears and sings of Montezuma's success.  As they finish with the spirits, the spirit of the Indian Queen appears to curse her former husband.  Montezuma resolves to fight the Spaniards.

Act 2, Scene 2. Between two Armies

Cydaria and Alibech standing waiting for Cortez to arrive. Once he does, Cydaria implores Cortez to peace. She criticises the choices he's given as showing the outcome to be a foregone conclusion. (“You threaten Peace, and yet invite a War”) She calls him a blind follower and declares his love of country was stronger than his love to her. As a particularly honour bound character, Cortez pledges to hold off his attack until the next day but is informed by Pizarro that the war has already started. The officers withdraw to war as Odmar and Guyomar enter to make Alibech decide her love for either before the battle begins. Alibech tells them that she loves one but not the other, not revealing which is which, but will marry whoever wins the war for their country. They all leave as the scene changes to the countryside battlefield where Mont. charges the field. Cortez condemns his Indian allies for cowardice. Cortez and his officers lead a cavalry charge of their own against the rear of Montezuma's forces. Odmar and Guyomar enter and are bragging of their kills when Montezuma enters with Alibecch declaring that the day
is lost due to the Spanish soldiers guns, “Our foes with Lightning and Thunder fight.”

The Commanders enter triumphant and make to seize Montezuma and Alibech but Guyomar defends Montezuma as Odmar flees with Alibech to safety. Guyomar covers Montezuma's retreat but is eventually overcome and captured by the Spaniards. Guards lead Guyomar off. Cortez and Cydaria enter. Cydaria has convinced Cortez to re-offer terms of peace to Montezuma. They talk of their love and Cortez reveals that he had a former love, now dead, that Cydaria resembles. They spar about whether his love for his dead wife will overshadow her. Cydaria is doubtful, so Cortez releases Guyomar as a token of his love. Guyomar is grateful and pledges brotherhood to Cortez. Guyomar leaves to convince Montezuma to hold three days of peace.

Act 3 Scene 1. A Chamber Royal

Odmar and Alibech are safe in the city with Odmar trying to claim Alibech's hand when
Guyomar enters. Each defend their earlier decision. Alibech declares the contest is not yet won. Montezuma, Almeria and Orbellan enter discussing Montezuma's options for peace. Almeria and Orbellan convince him to return to war, despite the protestations of Guyomar. Montezuma, Odmar, Guyomar and Alibech leave to prepare for more war.
Almeria and Orbellan stay behind. Guyomar returns and overhears their conversation as Almeria convinces Orbellan to try to assassinate Cortez. Almeria and Orbellan leave as Guyomar monologues his intent to warn Cortez, then exits.

Act 3 Scene 2. A Camp at Night

Cortez, unable to sleep for love, wanders alone and hears commotion in camp. Orbellan enters running, trying to disguise himself from pursuers. He tells Cortez that he is Taxallan and needs protection from harassment. Cortez promises his safety and hides Orbellan in his tent. Commanders enter and inform Cortez that Guyomar has been there to warn of Orbellan's assassination attempt. The commanders leave and Cortez brings out Orbellan and reveals his identity. On his honour he escorts Orbellan out of camp, but once they are out Cortez gives Orbellan a sword and challenges him to a duel. Orbellan is wounded in his sword hand. Cortez's honour compels him to free Orbellan but warns that he will attack the city on the next day, which is the day Orbellan is to marry Cydaria.

Act 3 Scene 3. Mexico

Montezuma, Odmar, Guyomar, and Almeria are awaiting Orbellan as the marriage approaches. They are discussing the starvation in the city due to the siege. Orbellan enters and pulls Almeria aside to tell his failure. Alibech and Cydaria enter to implore Montezuma to stay the wedding because Cydaria loves Cortez. A messenger enters to say that the war is back on at the city walls. More messengers arrive as the battle gets closer to the royal party. Cortez finally enters and slays Orbellan, but is outnumbered.
Guyomar forces Cortez to surrender his sword. Almeria calls for his head but Guyomar defends Cortez and returns Cortez's sword. Montezuma threatens Guyomar but Odmar steps between them. Odmar mediates Cortez's surrender. Cortez is given as prisoner to Guyomar in the castle on the lake. Almeria is pissed and vows revenge.

Act 4 Scene 1. A Prison

Almeria enters Cortez's cell to kill him. Cortez awakes and shows no fear of death, which makes Almeria fall in love with him. She can't kill him and instead tries to find out if he would love her instead of Cydaria. Cortez politely refuses, but she pretends it was a joke and leaves him alive anyway. Cortez contemplates his condition.

Act 4 Scene 2. A Chamber Royal

Montezuma, Odmar, Guyomar and Alibech discuss the growing threat of starvation and contemplate surrender. They decide to fight still, because Cortez though in chains has increased his terms of peace: “he in Chains demanded more/ Than he impos’d in Victory before”. Montezuma refuses to surrender: “If either Death or Bondage I must choose,/ I’ll keep my Freedom, though my Life I lose.” Guyomar grudgingly accepts command and Montezuma and Odmar leave to prepare for war. Alibech implores Guyomar to release Cortez and let the opposing army into the city to end their starvation.
Guyomar laments his choice between Alibech and the empire and decides through much
consideration to put his country first. A messenger arrives and tells Guyomar that the Spanish commanders are resting at a defenceless grotto. Guyomar leaves to go kill them and claim victory. Odmar enters and Alibech asks him what she asked of Guyomar.
Odmar agrees and leaves and Alibech monologues, revealing that she loves Guyomar even though he refused her, and she hates Odmar though he obeyed her. She laments that this would force her to marry Odmar in honour of her agreement.

Act 4 Scene 3 A Pleasant Grotto

Guyomar surprises the Spanish commanders and captures them. The Spaniards are led out as Montezuma, Alibech and a discontented Odmar enter. Montezuma commends Guyomar on his victory. Alibech pledges herself to him and Montezuma declares it their wedding day. Montezuma tells Odmar to guard the commanders. Montezuma, Alibech and Guyomar leave. Odmar realises that he was the one Alibech hated and is swayed to revenge on his rival. He orders Vasquez and Pizarro brought out and allies with them, promising them an easy victory. Vasquez requests the hand of a beauty whose name he does not know as his price. Pizarro wants gold.

Act 4 Scene 4. A Prison

Cortez and Almeria are again discussing Almeria's love for Cortez. Cortez doesn't believe her; she threatens to kill him if he doesn't return her love. Cortez is adamant that his heart belongs to Cydaria, but pledges to Almeria platonic love and devotion. As he kisses her hand, Cydaria enters. Cydaria misinterprets and accuses Cortez of infidelity.
Almeria realises the mistake but persists, declaring the same thing in an attempt to break
Cydaria's love for him. As Cortez is trying to prove his love, the Spanish led by Vasquez can be heard arriving. Almeria, fearing death by Spaniard, tries to kill Cydaria to keep her from Cortez. Cydaria runs behind Cortez, who is hurt instead. Almeria tries to kill herself but Cortez stops her. Pizarro and Vasquez arrive. Cortez promises Cydaria's protection and orders her into a tower in the prison to keep her safe, but refuses Almeria. Cortez promises not to kill Montezuma or Cydaria's brothers. They leave to put Cydaria away.
Almeria, despondent, leaves to let herself be killed in the battle. The Spanish return.
Cortez makes Pizarro guard the tower and leaves to fight. Pizarro leaves his post to
plunder instead.

Act 5 Scene 1. A Chamber Royal

Odmar enters with Guyomar and Alibech bound. Odmar unbinds Alibech and declares Alibech his queen; she refuses. He threatens her life if she won't accept. Guyomar resigns his right to her rather than let her die, but she chides him saying that it's still her choice.
Odmar threatens to kill Guyomar if she won't marry him. Alibech tries to barter, but is forced to agree to the match. She asks only to kiss Guyomar once. As they kiss they decide to die together. Vasquez enters and declares that Alibech is the one he wanted as his price. Odmar and Vasquez fight as Alibech frees Guyomar. Vasquez kills Odmar as Guyomar runs to his brother's sword. Guyomar fights and kills Vasquez.

Act 5 Scene 2. A Prison

Montezuma and an Aztec High Priest are tortured on the rack by a Christian priest and Pizarro in an effort to both locate more gold AND convert them to Christianity. “How wickedly he has refus’d his Wealth,/ and hid his gold from Christian hands by stealth”.
Montezuma refuses to submit, claiming that his gods are stronger. They get into a religious debate during the torture. The High Priest almost breaks, and asks Montezuma for permission to reveal the gold's location. Montezuma commands that he die instead.
And so he does. Cortez enters and frees Montezuma. He threatens Pizarro with Martial Law for letting the battle turn into a massacre and refuses to let anyone take gold, claiming it is cursed. (Money is the root of all evil!) Pizarro and the priest leave. Cortez and Montezuma make up. A Spanish messenger arrives to report that Guyomar is winning; Cortez leaves to rally his troops but promises to save Guyomar from death.
Almeria enters a changed woman, not yet dead, and asks Montezuma's love. She helps him to the base of Cydaria's tower and Montezuma yells for her to let them in. As Cydaria lets in Montezuma, Almeria tries to get in as well even though Cydaria doesn't trust her. They get in just as the Spanish arrive. Cortez tries to retrieve Cydaria, but Montezuma and Almeria refuse to let her go. Rather than be a slave to Cortez's charity, Montezuma, a proud man, commits suicide instead. The Spanish start to break into the tower. Almeria prepares to kill Cydaria one more time. Cortez tries to barter for her life. As they argue, Almeria stabs Cydaria and then herself. The Spanish break in and bring them to Cortez. Almeria declares her love for Cortez once more, asks Cydaria's forgiveness, and dies. Cydaria is not mortally wounded. Guyomar and Alibech enter captured, and Cortez releases them and offers to share power with them. They refuse and head far north instead. Cortez ends the play promising a grand funeral for Montezuma.

References

Plays by John Dryden
English Restoration plays
1665 plays
Aztecs in fiction
Tragedy plays